The year 2016 was the 7th year in the history of the Road Fighting Championship, an MMA promotion based in South Korea. 2016 started with Road FC 028 and ended with Road FC 035.

List of events

Road FC 035 

Xiaomi Road FC 035 was an MMA event held by Road FC on December 10, 2016, at the Jangchung Gymnasium in Seoul, South Korea.

Results

Road FC 034 

Xiaomi Road FC 034 was an MMA event held by Road FC on November 19, 2016, at the Hebei Gymnasium in Shijiazhuang, China.

Results

Road FC 033 

Xiaomi Road FC 033 was an MMA event held by Road FC on September 24, 2016, at the Jangchung Arena in Seoul, South Korea.

Results

Tournament Pair Assignment for selecting the first Champion in Road FC Open-weight Division

Road FC 032 

Xiaomi Road FC 032 was an MMA event held by Road FC on July 2, 2016, at the Hunan International Conference & Exhibition Center in Changsha, China.

Results

Road FC 031 

Xiaomi Road FC 031 was an MMA event held by Road FC on May 14, 2016, at the Jangchung Gymnasium in Seoul, South Korea.

Results

Road FC 030: in China 

Xiaomi Road FC 030 : in China was an MMA event held by Road FC on April 16, 2016, at the Workers' Stadium in Beijing, China.

Results

Road FC 029 

Xiaomi Road FC 029 was an MMA event held by Road FC on March 12, 2016, at the Wonju Chiak Gymnasium in Wonju, Gangwon, South Korea.

Results

Road FC 028 

Xiaomi Road FC 028 was an MMA event held by Road FC on January 31, 2016, at the Jangchung Gymnasium in Seoul, South Korea.

Results

See also
 List of Road FC events
 List of Road FC champions
 List of current Road FC fighters
 List of current mixed martial arts champions

References

2016
2016 in mixed martial arts
2016 in South Korean sport
2016 in Asian sport